Glitter Gulch may refer to:
"Glitter Gulch", a nickname for the casino area along Fremont Street in downtown Las Vegas
"Glitter Gulch", a nickname for the Collins Block and Brand Building in Aspen, Colorado, with their high concentration of upscale boutiques, and Aspen generally.
Glitter Gulch EP by British group Nine Black Alps 
"Glitter Gulch", a song from the Elvis Costello album King of America
"Glitter Gulch," an essay by Greg Baxter in The Dublin Review, issue 34
"Glitter Gulch," a discontinued Oakley, Inc. frame colour option on the original Oakley Zero series.
"Glitter Gulch," a television film in The Garfield Show.